The Joint Service Defence College (JSDC) was a training academy for British military personnel from 1983 to 1997. It has since been amalgamated into the Joint Services Command and Staff College.

History
The college was established as the Combined Staff College (CSC) in 1947. The college was an independent Ministry of Defence Establishment offering courses to officers of all three services. It was based at Latimer House in Latimer, Buckinghamshire. It was renamed the National Defence College (NDC) in 1971. On 12 February 1974, the IRA detonated a bomb at the NDC; there were no fatalities. In 1983 CSC was renamed the Joint Service Defence College (JSDC), and moved to the Royal Naval College, Greenwich. The college was closed in 1997 and amalgamated into the new Joint Services Command and Staff College.

Staff and students
The Commandant was a Major-general or equivalent. Senior Directing Staff included Royal Navy, British Army, Royal Air Force, civilian colonels and equivalent: civilian G5 or Assistant Secretary (Counsellor). Officers attending the course, which focussed on managing tri-service operations, were typically of lieutenant-colonel rank or equivalent and had to have the potential to rise at least two grades in rank. Three courses, each of nine months, were held every two years, each with 60 officers (typically 17 from each service plus 9 others from the civil service or the police). Those officers passing the course, or serving on the directing staff for at least six months, received the letters jsdc. The majority of students went on to joint, central staff or international appointments. The crest featured a cormorant, which was also the name of the college magazine.

See also
National Defence College (disambiguation)

References

Staff colleges
Military education and training in the United Kingdom